The Hàn River is a river located in the South Central Coast region of Vietnam. It originates in Quảng Nam Province and empties into the South China Sea at Da Nang.

Bridges 
Currently, there are six bridges across Hàn river:
 Thuận Phước Bridge
 Hàn River Bridge
 Dragon Bridge
 Trần Thị Lý Bridge
 Nguyễn Văn Trỗi Bridge
 Tiên Sơn Bridge

See also
Hàn River Bridge

References

Rivers of Da Nang
Rivers of Vietnam